Johan Ahmat Farizi (born 25 May 1990 in Malang, East Java) is an Indonesian professional footballer who plays as a left-back for and captains Liga 1 club Arema.

Career statistics

International

Honours

Club
Arema 
 Indonesia Super League: 2009–10
 East Java Governor Cup: 2013
 Indonesian Inter Island Cup: 2014/15
 Indonesia President's Cup: 2017, 2019, 2022

International
Indonesia U-23
 Islamic Solidarity Games  Silver medal: 2013

Individual
 Liga 1 Team of the Season: 2021–22

References

External Links 
 Johan Farizi at Liga Indonesia
 

Living people
1990 births
People from Malang
Sportspeople from Malang
Sportspeople from East Java
Indonesian footballers
Arema F.C. players
Liga 1 (Indonesia) players
Indonesian Super League-winning players
Indonesian Premier League players
Persija Jakarta players
Association football fullbacks
Association football wingers
Indonesia youth international footballers
Indonesia international footballers